Hatamabad may refer to:
Hatamabad, Chaharmahal and Bakhtiari
Hatamabad, Hamadan
Hatamabad, Delfan, Lorestan Province
Hatamabad, Selseleh, Lorestan Province
Hatamabad, Markazi
Hatamabad, South Khorasan